Songs for Any Taste is a 1957 live album by Mel Tormé, recorded at the Crescendo Club. 

Interspersed with studio recordings, this is one of three albums that Tormé released with material from his appearances at the club.

Track listing
 "Autumn Leaves" (Joseph Kosma, Johnny Mercer, Jacques Prévert) – 1:32
 "Tenderly" (Walter Gross, Jack Lawrence) – 2:31
 "I Wish I Were in Love Again" (Lorenz Hart, Richard Rodgers) – 2:18
 "It's De-Lovely" (Cole Porter) – 2:42
 "It's All Right with Me" (Porter) – 4:28
 "Manhattan" (Hart, Rodgers) – 3:14
 "Taking a Chance on Love" (Vernon Duke, Ted Fetter, John La Touche) – 2:28
 "Home by the Sea" (Fetter, Lewing) – 1:24
 "I Got Plenty o' Nuttin'" (George Gershwin, Ira Gershwin, DuBose Heyward) – 3:24
 "Nobody's Heart" (Hart, Rodgers) – 2:21

Personnel 
Mel Tormé - vocals, drums
Don Fagerquist - trumpet
Howard McGhee
Larry Bunker - accordion, bongos, vibraphone
Max Bennett - double bass
Stan Levey - drums
Mel Lewis - drums
Ralph Sharon - piano
Marty Paich - arranger, conductor

References

Mel Tormé live albums
Albums arranged by Marty Paich
1957 live albums
Bethlehem Records live albums
Albums conducted by Marty Paich